These are the Oricon number one albums of 1993, per the Oricon Albums Chart.

Chart history

References

1993 record charts
Lists of number-one albums in Japan
1993 in Japanese music